Marion Lake is located in Grand Teton National Park, in the U. S. state of Wyoming. Marion Lake is situated near the head of Granite Canyon and is adjacent to the Teton Crest Trail. The round trip hike on the Rendezvous Mountain Trail to the lake from the top of Rendezvous Mountain by way of the ski tram from Jackson Hole Mountain Resort is considered a strenuous .

References

Lakes of Grand Teton National Park